Farinelli and the King is a 2015 play with music by Claire van Kampen. The play involves King Philip V of Spain who is troubled with insomnia. It premiered in London in 2015 and on Broadway in 2017.

Productions
The play made its world premiere at the Sam Wanamaker Playhouse, London on 11 February 2015, running until 7 March. The production transferred to the Duke of York's Theatre where it was co-produced by Sonia Friedman, again starring Mark Rylance. It played a limited run from 14 September 2015 until 5 December.

The play had its Broadway premiere, again starring Mark Rylance and directed by John Dove, at the Belasco Theatre. Previews started 5 December 2017 with an official opening on 17 December 2017. The limited run concluded on 25 March 2018.
The play recouped its Broadway capitalization.

Synopsis

King Philip V of Spain suffers from mental troubles which have made his counsellors deem him unfit to rule. As the play opens, he is seen fishing for his pet goldfish in a large brandy glass, then panicking when his Queen and second wife, the Italian Isabella Farnese, lights some candles, and extinguishing them with the water from the goldfish glass. Isabella travels to London, where she hears the famous castrato Farinelli sing and gets the idea that the inspiring and soothing power of his music could help her husband emerge from depression. She asks the impresario Rich, producer of The Beggar’s Opera, to present this proposal to Farinelli; he treats her contemptuously as just another crazed fan of Farinelli until she leaves and he reads her note and realizes to his horror that she really is the Queen of Spain.

Farinelli comes to Spain and to the court, and King Philip makes him prove who he is by asking him harsh questions. Farinelli reveals that it was his brother Riccardo who castrated him when he was ten to preserve his wonderful soprano voice, and answers yes to Philip’s blunt query as to whether he can have sex with a woman. (Men castrated solely for purposes of singing lost only their testicles, so this is true.) He then sings for Philip.

(The Singer, billed as such, is a countertenor dressed in a costume identical to the one the actor playing Farinelli wears, and who sings Farinelli's musical role. There are two reasons for this. One is casting: a good actor and a wonderful countertenor singer are rarely found in the same body. The second is dramatic: Farinelli-the-man looks at the super-celebrity Farinelli-the-singer as a distinct 'other' self.)

When Farinelli/The Singer has sung beautifully for the King, Philip’s chief counsellor and his doctor come in with a complex budget report and a document of abdication; if Philip cannot understand the budget report, they will get him to abdicate. Philip pages hastily through the budget report and suddenly makes incisive and brilliant comments on its omissions and mistakes. The music therapy has worked, and the abdication is shelved.

Farinelli continues to sing for Philip and Isabella, and the King continues to rule viably, but is still whimsical. He decides to go and live in the middle of the forest so that he can hear the stars singing. Farinelli and Isabella go with him, and Farinelli gives a concert in the woods, to which all the local villagers and forest-dwelling commoners come uninvited. The theater audience stands in for these spectators, Philip addressing some audience members as specific local characters, and Farinelli sings for all.

Farinelli and Queen Isabella develop feelings for each other, and Farinelli/The Singer sings her a love aria which is heartfelt and emotional rather than just brilliant and impressive like his earlier arias. They realize that they must get Philip to leave the forest. He does, lamenting that he had almost got to be able to hear the singing of the stars. He continues to be able to rule, and is last seen dressing in ceremonial armour and mounting an effigy of a horse to pose for an official portrait. Meanwhile, Isabella gets an opera house built in Madrid despite courtiers’ comments that opera will never succeed in Spain.

Rich, who has appeared from time to time commenting on developments in the theatrical and political world, meets Isabella again, no longer at court because Philip is dead and her hostile stepson is King. Farinelli is then seen in retirement in Bologna. His friend and tailor begs him to sing his greatest aria, Handel’s "Lascia ch’io pianga" (“Let me weep”), which is even more sincerely emotional than his outpouring to Isabella. As The Singer fills the theater with the beautiful sadness of the aria, Farinelli’s friend quietly leaves him alone. At the end, The Singer touches Farinelli affectionately and withdraws.

Cast

Note: All cast members reprised their roles for each production

 Mark Rylance as Philip V of Spain
 Sam Crane as Farinelli
 Iestyn Davies as Farinelli's singing voice
 Melody Grove as Isabella Farnese
Colin Hurley as Metastasio
 Simon Jones as John Rich
 Huss Garbiya as Doctor Jose Cervi
 Edward Peel as De la Cuadra
 Matthew Darcy as Jethro

Awards and nominations

Original West End production

Original Broadway production

References

External links
Internet Broadway database

2015 plays
English plays
Plays set in Spain
Plays set in the 18th century
Cultural depictions of Spanish kings
Cultural depictions of Farinelli
Insomnia
Plays based on real people
Biographical plays about musicians